The 2016–17 USC Upstate Spartans men's basketball team represented the University of South Carolina Upstate during the 2016–17 NCAA Division I men's basketball season. The Spartans, led by 15th-year head coach Eddie Payne, played their home games at the G. B. Hodge Center in Spartanburg, South Carolina as members of the Atlantic Sun Conference. They finished the season 17–16, 7–7 in ASUN play to finish in a tie for fourth place. They lost in the quarterfinals of the ASUN tournament to Kennesaw State. They were invited to the CollegeInsider.com Tournament where they lost in the first round to Furman.

This would be Eddie Payne's final season as head coach at USC Upstate, as he announced his retirement On October 3, 2017.

Previous season
The Spartans finished the 2015–16 season 10–22, 4–10 in A-Sun play to finish in a tie for seventh place. They lost in the quarterfinals of the A-Sun tournament to North Florida.

Roster

Schedule and results

|-
!colspan=9 style=| Non-conference regular season

|-
!colspan=9 style=| Atlantic Sun Conference regular season

|-
!colspan=9 style=| Atlantic Sun tournament

|-
!colspan=9 style=| CIT

References

USC Upstate Spartans men's basketball seasons
USC Upstate
USC Upstate
Charleston Southern Buc South Carolina
Charleston Southern Buc South Carolina